Boconita is a small genus of South American cellar spiders. It was first described by B. A. Huber and O. Villarreal in 2020, and it has only been found in Venezuela.  it contains only two species: B. sayona and B. yacambu.

See also
 List of Pholcidae species

References

Pholcidae genera
Invertebrates of Venezuela